Oliver Martin Johnston Jr. (October 31, 1912 – April 14, 2008) was an American motion picture animator. He was one of Disney's Nine Old Men, and the last surviving at the time of his death from natural causes. He was recognized by The Walt Disney Company with its Disney Legend Award in 1989. His work was recognized with the National Medal of Arts in 2005.

Career
Johnston was an animator at Walt Disney Studios from 1934 to 1978, and became a directing animator beginning with Pinocchio, released in 1940. He contributed to most Disney animated features, including Fantasia and Bambi. His last full work for Disney came with The Rescuers, in which he was caricatured as one of the film's characters, the cat Rufus. The last film he worked on was The Fox and the Hound. His work includes Mr. Smee (in Peter Pan), the Stepsisters (in Cinderella), the District Attorney (in The Adventures of Ichabod and Mr. Toad), and Prince John (in Robin Hood). According to the book The Disney Villain, written by Johnston and Frank Thomas, Johnston also partnered with Thomas on creating characters such as Ichabod Crane (in The Adventures of Ichabod and Mr. Toad), Sir Hiss (in Robin Hood), and story consultant in Little Nemo: Adventures in Slumberland.

Johnston co-authored, with Frank Thomas, the reference book Disney Animation: The Illusion of Life, which contained the 12 basic principles of animation. This book helped preserve the knowledge of the techniques that were developed at the studio. The partnership of Frank Thomas and Ollie Johnston is fondly presented in the documentary Frank and Ollie, produced by Thomas' son Theodore, who in 2012 also produced another documentary, Growing up with Nine Old Men, included in the Diamond Edition of the Peter Pan DVD.

Personal life

Born in Palo Alto, California to Oliver, a Stanford professor, and Florence Johnston, Johnston had two older sisters, Winifred and Florence. Johnston attended Palo Alto High School and Stanford University, where he worked on the campus humor magazine Stanford Chaparral with fellow future animator Frank Thomas, with whom he formed a lifelong friendship. Johnston then transferred to the Chouinard Art Institute in his senior year. Ollie married a fellow Disney employee, ink and paint artist Marie Worthey, in 1943. Marie Johnston died May 20, 2005 at the age of 87.

Ollie's lifelong hobby was live steam trains. Starting in 1949, he built the  gauge La Cañada Valley Railroad, a miniature backyard railroad with three 1:12-scale locomotives at his home in Flintridge, California. The locomotives are now owned by his sons. This railroad was one of the inspirations for Walt Disney to build his own backyard railroad, the Carolwood Pacific Railroad, which inspired the building of the railroad in Disneyland in Anaheim, California. Ollie was a founding Governor of the Carolwood Pacific Historical Society along with his fellow Disney animator and railfan, Ward Kimball. The 1:4-scale Victorian depot from Ollie's backyard was restored and moved to a location near Walt Disney's Carolwood Barn within the Los Angeles Live Steamers Railroad Museum in Griffith Park, Los Angeles.

In the 1960s, Ollie acquired and restored a full-size,  narrow gauge Porter steam locomotive originally built in 1901, which he named the Marie E. He also built the Deer Lake Park & Julian Railroad (DLP&J) at his vacation estate in Julian, California in order to run the locomotive with a small gondola and caboose pulled behind it. Johnston sold the vacation estate and the narrow gauge train in 1993. The engine and its consist were later sold to John Lasseter (of Pixar Studios fame) around 2002. On May 10, 2005, it ran on the Disneyland Railroad during a private early morning event organized by Lasseter to honor Johnston, who was able to take the throttle of the Marie E. one last time. This was the first time that the Walt Disney Company permitted outside railroad equipment to run at any Disney Resort. The engine is still fully operational and presently runs on the Justi Creek Railway, located within the vineyards of Lasseter Family Winery, also owned by Lasseter.

In the 1980s and 90s, Johnston served on the advisory board of the National Student Film Institute and often was a presenter at the annual film festival's award ceremonies. Brad Bird paid a tribute to Ollie Johnston with an animated cameo of Johnston in the 2004 Pixar film The Incredibles, as well as a cameo in his 1999 film The Iron Giant, where Johnston played a train engineer. Both cameos also included Frank Thomas.

On November 10, 2005, Ollie Johnston was among the recipients of the prestigious National Medal of Arts, presented by President George W. Bush in an Oval Office ceremony.

Ollie Johnston died of natural causes on April 14, 2008, at the age of 95. He was the last surviving member of Disney's Nine Old Men at the time of his death.

Filmography

Books by Johnston
 Disney Animation: The Illusion of Life (1981)
Too Funny for Words: Disney's Greatest Sight Gags
Walt Disney's Bambi—the Story and the Film
The Disney Villain

See also
Rail transport in Walt Disney Parks and Resorts

References

Bibliography

External links

Frank and Ollie's official site

Disney Legends
Ollie's backyard railroad
"Ollie Johnston: Last of the Red-Hot Animators" by John Canemaker - Wall Street Journal - April 22, 2008; Page D9
Carolwood Pacific Historical Society Web site

1912 births
2008 deaths
20th-century American writers
Writers from Palo Alto, California
American animated film directors
Palo Alto High School alumni
Stanford University alumni
United States National Medal of Arts recipients
University of California, Berkeley alumni
Walt Disney Animation Studios people
Film directors from California
Animators from California
Disney Legends
Chouinard Art Institute alumni